Hellinsia osteodactyla is a moth of the family Pterophoridae. It is found in most of Europe (except the Benelux, Iceland, Ireland and Greece), as well as North Africa and from Asia Minor to Japan. Also known as the small golden-rod plume it was first described by Philipp Christoph Zeller in 1841.

Adults are on wing at dusk in July and come to light.

The larvae feed on the flowers and seed-heads of European goldenrod (Solidago virgaurea), Senecio nemorensis, silver ragwort (Senecio bicolour) and goldilocks aster (Aster linosyris).

References

osteodactyla
Moths described in 1841
Plume moths of Africa
Plume moths of Asia
Plume moths of Europe
Taxa named by Philipp Christoph Zeller